Vickie Eng (or Vicki Eng) is an American actress, licensed chiropractor and practitioner/proponent of self healing techniques, such as Taoist Chi Kung. She is best known for playing the role of "W" on the show Good Eats (and later became the chiropractor of the show's host Alton Brown), and for playing Judge Rita Mayson in Drop Dead Diva. She lives in Atlanta, Georgia.

She has released two instructional self-healing videos: Oriental Secrets: Heavenly Circulation of Chi and Oriental Secrets: Chi Gong for Better Health.

Filmography
Venom (2018) as Riot (credited as "Elderly Village Woman / Riot Host")  
A Madea Christmas (2013) as Customer #6 
We're the Millers (2013) as Nurse 
The Change-Up (2011) as Erin Walsh 
Taking Chances (2009) as Kitty Truslow 
The Gospel (2005) as Doctor 
Diary of a Mad Black Woman (2005) as Christina 
The Staremaster (2003) as Rene
Broken (2003) as Mrs. Cheng 
The Conspiracy (2003) as Bank Manager
Chung King Express (1994) as Bar Maid

TV series
Greenleaf (2016) as Maricel
Homeland (2011) as CIA Agent
The Vampire Diaries (2011) as Nurse 
The Chin Chens (2011) as Hoa Chin Chen 
Homeland (2011) as Elizabeth Chu 
Detroit 1-8-7 (2010) as Lady Neighbor 
Drop Dead Diva (2009-2011) as Judge Rita Mayson 
Meet the Browns (2009) as Family Member 
Active Parenting of Teens: 3rd Edition (2008) as Mrs. Kwan 
K-Ville (2007) as Nail Shop Worker (Fong Trang) 
Army Wives (2007) as Dr. Lasgrove 
Thief (2006) as Dr. W 
Good Eats (1999-2009, 2019) as "W"/Ms. Wong/Vicki Wong/"Wilhelmina"
Savannah (1996) as Sales Clerk 
In the Heat of the Night (1990) as Call Girl

References

External links

 Vickie Eng on Facebook
 

Living people
American film actresses
American television actresses
Year of birth missing (living people)
21st-century American women